Toska or Toskas may refer to the following:

Places
Toska, Island in Norway
Toska, Struga, former village in North Macedonia
Toska, Iran, village in Iran

People

Surname Toska
Ajet Toska (born 1961), Albanian hammer thrower
David Toska (born 1975), Norwegian bank robber
Haki Toska (1920 – 1994), Albanian politician
Klajdi Toska (born 1994), Albanian footballer

Surname Toskas 
Dimitris Toskas (born 1991), Greek footballer
Grigoris Toskas (born 1983), Greek footballer
Nikos Toskas (born 1952), Greek general

Other
Toska, the transliterated (from Russian "Тоска") name of the Anton Checkov story that translates as "Misery"

See also

Toka (disambiguation)
Tonka (disambiguation)
Tosa (disambiguation)
Tosca (disambiguation)
Troska (disambiguation)
Tuska (disambiguation)
Tyska (disambiguation)